The 1st Louisiana Regiment Cavalry was a cavalry unit in the Union Army during the American Civil War. The regiment was one of several organized in New Orleans in August 1862 by order of Maj. Gen. Benjamin F. Butler and recruited from among "white Unionists, and pro-Northern refugees" in the city; it consisted primarily of foreigners and men of Northern birth.

Service
The unit was assigned in 1863 to the Union XIX Corps of Maj. Gen. Nathaniel P. Banks in the Department of the Gulf.

They participated in operations in Western Louisiana: Fort Bisland, Irish Bend, and Vermillion Bayou in April, 1863 and in the Siege of Port Hudson from May to July. The regiment participated in the Red River Campaign from March to May, 1864.

The unit left Louisiana and moved to Fort Barrancas, Florida in February 1865. It joined the campaign against Mobile, Alabama. The regiment then marched to Blakely, across the Mobile River, taking control of its Fort Blakely, a major fort during the war. This completed Confederate defeat in the area.

The unit mustered out on December 18, 1865.

2nd Louisiana Regiment Cavalry
The 2nd Louisiana Regiment Cavalry was originally organized as the 3rd Louisiana Infantry in New Orleans on November 25, 1863. After serving at the defenses of  Brashear City, Baton Rouge and Port Hudson, the unit was consolidated with 1st Louisiana Cavalry on September 7, 1864.

See also
 List of Louisiana Union Civil War units

References

Louisiana Regiment Cavalry, 001
Military units and formations established in 1862
1862 establishments in Louisiana
Military units and formations disestablished in 1865

Further reading